Lord Douglas William Cope Gordon (11 October 1851 – 4 August 1888), was a Scottish Liberal Party politician.

Gordon was the fourth son of Charles Gordon, 10th Marquess of Huntly, and his second wife Maria Antoinetta (née Pegus). Charles Gordon, 11th Marquess of Huntly, was his elder brother. He entered Parliament for West Aberdeenshire in 1876, a seat he held until 1880, and then represented Huntingdonshire from 1880 to 1885.

Gordon died unmarried in August 1888, aged 36.

References

External links 
 

1851 births
1888 deaths
Younger sons of marquesses
Members of the Parliament of the United Kingdom for Scottish constituencies
Conservative Party (UK) MPs for English constituencies
UK MPs 1874–1880
UK MPs 1880–1885
Scottish Liberal Party MPs